The South Crew ("STH-CRW")  is a Dutch football tifosi group associated with AFC Ajax. The name is from their location the stand in Ajax' home stadium Amsterdam Arena, namely Zuid-1 and Zuid-2.

Background 
South Crew was founded 26 August 2007 by hardcore supporters of the club who wanted to help create more atmosphere in the stadiums south end. The group occupied the Zuid-1 and Zuid-2 stands of the Amsterdam ArenA from where they raise massive banners at the beginning of Ajax home matches. Although the group commonly work together with the likes of VAK410 to coordinate much larger spectacles in the stands, due to their close proximity in the stadium, the South Crew do however distance themselves from the hooligan activities of VAK410, as the South Crew restrict their actions to choreography and atmosphere in the stadium and do not partake in the violent clashes as the other Ultras do before and after the games. The South Crew and the North Up Alliance are also the two groups at Ajax responsible for the graffiti pieces that are found inside the tunnels of the Amsterdam Arena, from the players entrance to the locker rooms. The South Crew also organize the South Crew Lottery giving away prizes to the winners, in order to fund the operation and the construction of the massive banners. Known as one of the most popular Tifosi groups in the Netherlands, often finding themselves in Dutch press for the manner in which they present their statements, the South Crew also collaborate with AFC Ajax, Axion and the City of Amsterdam in the annual Ajax Campus initiative. With Ajax Campus, club representatives and members of the South Crew visit various school campuses in and around Amsterdam, teaching children (ages 14–17) how to create banners, which in turn are then displayed in the stands of the South Crew during one of the home matches of Ajax each season.

Judaism 
Ajax is popularly seen as having "Jewish roots" and in the 1970s supporters of rival teams began taunting Ajax fans by calling them Jews. Ajax fans (few of whom are actually Jewish) responded by embracing Ajax's "Jewish" identity: calling themselves "super Jews", chanting "Joden, Joden"" (Jews, Jews) at games, and adopting Jewish symbols such as the Star of David and the Israeli flag. This Jewish imagery eventually became a central part of Ajax fans' culture. At one point ringtones of "Hava Nagila", a Hebrew folk song, could be downloaded from the club's official website. Beginning in the 1980s, fans of Ajax's rivals escalated their antisemitic rhetoric, chanting slogans like "Hamas, Hamas/all Jews to the gas" ("Hamas, hamas, alle joden aan het gas"), hissing to imitate the flow of gas, giving Nazi salutes, etc. The eventual result was that many (genuinely) Jewish Ajax fans stopped going to games. In the 2000s the club began trying to persuade fans to drop their Jewish image, yet have achieved no success in this pursuit. Supporters, on and off the field, still employ imagery associated with Jewish history and the Israeli nation. Tottenham Hotspur's Yid Army use similar symbols.

See also 
F-side
North Up Alliance
VAK410
Tifosi
Ultras

References

External links
South Crew Official website

AFC Ajax
Association football supporters
2007 establishments in the Netherlands